Tanarattha Udomchavee (born October 22, 1989) is a Thai beach volleyball player. She competed at the 2012 Asian Beach Games in Haiyang, China.

References

External links
 
 

1989 births
Living people
Tanarattha Udomchavee
Tanarattha Udomchavee
Asian Games medalists in beach volleyball
Tanarattha Udomchavee
Beach volleyball players at the 2014 Asian Games
Beach volleyball players at the 2018 Asian Games
Place of birth missing (living people)
Medalists at the 2014 Asian Games
Competitors at the 2019 Southeast Asian Games
Tanarattha Udomchavee
Southeast Asian Games medalists in volleyball
Tanarattha Udomchavee